Trevor Hutchinson is a Northern Irish bass player and a founding member of Lúnasa. Born in Cookstown, County Tyrone, in Northern Ireland, he played with numerous bands before Lúnasa, including The Waterboys and Sharon Shannon.

Discography
With Lúnasa
 Lúnasa (1999)
 Otherworld (1999)
 The Merry Sisters of Fate (2001)
 Redwood (2003)
 The Kinnitty Sessions (2004)
 Sé (2006)
 Lá Nua (2010)
With Colleen Raney
 Here This is Home (2013)

External links

His official Lúnasa profile

The Waterboys members
People from Cookstown
Living people
Bass guitarists from Northern Ireland
Lúnasa (band) members
Year of birth missing (living people)
Musicians from County Tyrone